The Therapist is a 2021 Nigerian drama film directed by Kayode Kasum. The film stars Rita Dominic, Michelle Dede, Toyin Abraham in the lead roles. The film was released on 26 March 2021.

Synopsis 
The story is based on a woman who has lost the happiness in her life after getting married and eventually obtains divorce from her abusive husband. She then offers voluntary help to other women in the society who also seek to obtain divorce from their abusive disloyal unfaithful husbands.

Cast 

 Rita Dominic
 Michelle Dede
 Toyin Abraham
 Shafy Bello
 Tope Tedela
 Anthony Monjaro
 Saeed Balogun
 Anee Icha

References 

English-language Nigerian films
Nigerian drama films
2021 drama films
Films directed by Kayode Kasum
2020s English-language films